John Richard Bartje Pangkey (8 May 1950 – 6 June 2022) was an Indonesian military officer and politician. A member of the Regional Unity Party, he served in the West Kalimantan Regional People's Representative Council from 1999 to 2004.

He died in Pontianak on 6 June 2022 at the age of 72.

References

1950 births
2022 deaths
Members of the West Kalimantan Regional People's Representative Council
Indonesian military personnel
People from West Kalimantan